The 1940–41 Washington State Cougars men's basketball team represented Washington State College for the  college basketball season. Led by thirteenth-year head coach Jack Friel, the Cougars were members of the Pacific Coast Conference and played their home games on campus at WSC Gymnasium in Pullman, Washington.

They met Southern division Stanford in a best-of-three series in Pullman for the PCC title, which the Cougars swept in 

Washington State advanced to the eight-team NCAA tournament in Kansas City; they defeated Creighton and Arkansas to advance to the final, but lost to Wisconsin by five points.

This remains the most successful season for Cougar men's basketball; WSU has made five NCAA tournament appearances since (1980, 1983, 1994, 2007, 2008), and the best result is the Sweet Sixteen in 2008.

Postseason results

|-
!colspan=5 style=| Pacific Coast Conference Playoff Series

|-
!colspan=5 style=| NCAA tournament

References

External links
Sports Reference – Washington State Cougars: 1940–41 basketball season

Washington State Cougars men's basketball seasons
Washington State Cougars
NCAA Division I men's basketball tournament Final Four seasons
Washington State
Washington State
Washington State